The LG Wing 5G is an Android-based phablet manufactured by LG Electronics. The device features a swivel design where the main display can be rotated to form a T-shape, revealing a smaller secondary display. On April 5, 2021 LG announced it will be shutting down its mobile phone division and ceasing production of all remaining devices. LG noted the phone will be available until existing inventory runs out. This was considered the last phone LG had made.

Design 
The LG Wing uses an anodized aluminum frame with chamfered edges; both displays and the back panel are protected by unspecified glass. The lower screen has a high lubricity polyacetal that surrounds the front panel. The top bezel of the lower section houses the earpiece. There are two color options, Aurora Gray and Illusion Sky.

It can be used like a conventional smartphone in its default state, or in any orientation in swivel mode. Turning the main display clockwise activates swivel mode, where the main display has a landscape mode showing the date and time, as well as an app carousel. In addition to running two apps simultaneously, the secondary display can act as a digital camera gimbal or media controls.

Hinge

The phone utilizes a hinge that can rotate 90 degrees. The hinge has a double locking mechanism, and is secured by two springs which guide the phone to an opened or closed position. A small hydraulic damper allows for more refined movements of the hinge. LG rated the mechanism as supporting up to 200,000 uses.

Hardware 
The LG Wing is powered by the Qualcomm Snapdragon 765G and Adreno 620 GPU. It has 128 or 256 GB of UFS internal storage, paired with 8 GB of LPDDR4X RAM. MicroSD card expansion is supported through a hybrid dual-SIM slot, up to 1 TB.

The main display is shared with the Velvet and V60 ThinQ, a 6.8" FHD+ P-OLED with a 41:18 aspect ratio, and the secondary display is a 3.9" G-OLED with an 31:27 aspect ratio. The main display also features an under-screen optical fingerprint scanner. The battery capacity is 4000 mAh, and can be recharged wired over USB-C at up to 25 W or wirelessly via Qi at up to 9 W.

Camera

The camera array is located in the corner with a rectangular protrusion housing three cameras. The rear cameras are similar to the V60's, with identical 64 MP wide and 13 MP ultrawide sensors. The third camera is an additional 12 MP ultrawide sensor which is used for the digital camera gimbal. The front-facing camera is concealed by a motorized pop-up mechanism, and uses a 32 MP sensor.

Software 
The LG Wing runs on Android 11. Wing uses LG's UX 10.

References 

LG Electronics smartphones
Wing
Mobile phones introduced in 2020
Android (operating system) devices
Mobile phones with multiple rear cameras
Mobile phones with 4K video recording
Dual screen phone